Adamovićevo Naselje is an urban neighborhood of the city of Novi Sad, Serbia.

Borders

The northern border of Adamovićevo Naselje is Futoška ulica (Futoška Street), the eastern borders are Ulica Vojvode Knićanina (Vojvoda Knićanin Street) and Ulica Kola srpskih sestara (Kolo srpskih sestara Street), the southern border is Bulevar cara Lazara (Boulevard of tzar Lazar), and the western border is Bulevar Evrope (Boulevard of Europe).

In other words, Adamovićevo Naselje is located between Liman 4 in the south, Grbavica in the east, Telep in the west, and Sajmište with Provincial hospital in the north.

Features
There are two schools in Adamovićevo Naselje: Vasa Stajić elementary school, and April 7 secondary school of medicine.

This part of the city is mostly composed of private houses, but in recent time (circa from the year 2000), more tier buildings have been built, mostly on major artery, Cara Dušana Street.

The Institute for public health of Vojvodina (also known as "Higijenski zavod") and University of Novi Sad Institute for poplar research (Institut za topolarstvo) are situated within the neighborhood.

Adamovićevo Naselje is home to some of the city's wealthiest families. It houses business headquarters and/or private homes of the owners of "Swisslion" (food and candy industry), "Matijević" (meat industry, "Aleksandar" (real-estate developers), and "Rodić MB" (a retail company).

In year 2006, "Subotički bulevar" (Subotica Boulevard) was built. It is located in the place where railway tracks used to run through (space formerly occupied by Ulica Polgar Andraša (Polgar Andraš Street) and Ulica Novaka Radonjića (Novak Radonjić Street)), on the western border of Adamovićevo Naselje. Since completion of the new boulevard, many tier buildings were built in this area, with many more being under construction.

History
Its old name was Daranjijevo Naselje (Daranji Telep). In 1927, it was named Adamovićevo Naselje after a famous Adamović family. Until 1944, name Adamovićevo Naselje was used for both, present-day Adamovićevo Naselje and present-day Telep, but since 1944, Telep is considered a separate neighborhood.

Politics
Seat of the local municipality "7. Juli" (which also includes some parts of Grbavica neighborhood) is located in Adamovićevo Naselje, in Miše Dimitrijevića street.

Religious buildings
There are several religious buildings in the neighborhood:
Protestant theological college
Christian Baptist Church and Evangelic Church
Religious building of Protestant Christian Community
Jehovah's Witnesses prayer hall
Masjid of Islamic Religious Community
Franciscan monastery of Saint Ivan Kapistran
Uniate monastery

Public transportation
Lines 2, 6, 7, 9, 11, 12, 52, 53, 54, 55, 56 and 70 of municipal transportation company JGSP Novi Sad are going through or pass by Adamovićevo naselje.

See also
 Neighborhoods of Novi Sad

References
Jovan Mirosavljević, Brevijar ulica Novog Sada 1745-2001, Novi Sad, 2002.
Zoran Rapajić, Novi Sad bez tajni, Beograd, 2002.
30 godina mesne zajednice "7. Juli" u Novom Sadu 1974-2004, Novi Sad, 2004.

Novi Sad neighborhoods